The Markham Arms is a former pub at 138 King's Road, London SW3. It closed as a pub in the early 1990s, and is now a branch of the Santander bank.

It is a Grade II listed building, built in the mid-19th century.

References

Grade II listed pubs in London
Former pubs in London
Pubs in the Royal Borough of Kensington and Chelsea
Grade II listed buildings in the Royal Borough of Kensington and Chelsea
King's Road, Chelsea, London